Nolan D. Archibald (born 1943) is the retired chairman of the board, president and chief executive officer of the Black & Decker Corporation. Following the merger with Stanley Works,
Archibald became executive chairman of the board of Stanley Black & Decker, Inc.

Early life, education and athletics
Archibald graduated from Dixie State College (now Utah Tech University) where he was an honor student and All-American basketball player. He led his team to the National Junior College finals in Hutchinson, Kansas and was recruited by over 50 major universities in the United States. Archibald graduated from Weber State University, cum laude, where he was Scholar Athlete of the Year in 1968. He was an All-Conference basketball player under Coach Dick Motta and played on Weber State's first team to participate in the then 32-team NCAA basketball tournament. He was one of fifteen Division I basketball players out of 4,000 named an Academic All-American.

Archibald went on to earn a master's degree in business administration from the Harvard Business School in 1970. Archibald was invited in both 1969 and 1970 to try out for the Chicago Bulls in the National Basketball Association. He was offered a contract in 1970 to play for the Pittsburgh Pipers in the American Basketball Association.

In 1993, the National Association of Basketball Coaches honored Archibald, along with four other former All-American basketball players, (including Elvin Hayes), as their “Silver Anniversary NCAA All-American Basketball Team”. Archibald is the only athlete in Weber State's history to receive this honor.

Career
Archibald held various management positions before leading the consumer durables division of the Beatrice Company, whose brands included Stiffel lamps, Samsonite luggage and Aristokraft kitchen cabinets. He joined Black & Decker as president and chief operating officer in September 1985. When appointed president and chief executive officer in March 1986 at the age of 42, Archibald was the youngest CEO of a Fortune 500 Company.

In 1989 Archibald made the near disastrous mis-step of out-bidding other companies to purchase Emhart Corporation for $2.8B in debt. Black & Decker was able to service the debt because of profit from the launch of DeWalt in 1992 and subsequent success in becoming the world's largest professional and industrial power tools brand.

Archibald served as chief executive officer for 24 years and was the last CEO of Black & Decker. At the time of the merger with Stanley in March 2010, Archibald was the second longest-serving CEO of the largest 1000 companies in the United States that were not family controlled. 

He is a recipient of the American Marketing Association’s Edison Achievement Award for significant and lasting contributions to marketing excellence and product innovation. He has been cited by Business Week as one of the top six managers in the United States and by Fortune Magazine as one of the country’s “ten most wanted” executives. 

He serves on the BYU Presidents Leadership Council and the Marriott National Advisory Council.  He served as Lead Director on the Huntsman Corporation's Board of Directors for many years.  He was a member of the Board of Brunswick Corporation for 24 years, and served as a member of the Lockheed Martin Corporation’s Board of Directors for 17 years.  He recently served as Lead Director on the Lockheed Martin Corporation’s Board of Directors.  Other past board memberships include: ITT Corporation, the Johns Hopkins University Board of Trustees, the Board of Directors of the Associates of the Harvard Business School, and the Board of the NCAA National Association of Basketball Coaches.

Personal life
Nolan Archibald and his wife, Margaret (Hafen), have seven sons and one daughter: Jason, Lance, Jared, Jordan, Anthony, Cameron, Austin and Ashley. Seven are graduates of Brigham Young University. Jared graduated from Harvard University and received an MBA from Stanford University's School of Business. Following BYU, Jason graduated from Duke Medical School and the five-year Johns Hopkins University Orthopedic Surgery Residency Program. Five sons have graduated from the Harvard Business School. All the sons were Eagle Scouts and served missions for the Church of Jesus Christ of Latter-day Saints. Nolan and Margaret Archibald also have 32 grandchildren.

Notes

References
forbes listing on Archibald
Church News, April 28, 2007
listing of Marriott School National Advisory Council members
Brunswick board of directors
Lockheed Martin Board of Directors
Black & Decker III: Death by Poor Governance

1943 births
Living people
Businesspeople from Ogden, Utah
American leaders of the Church of Jesus Christ of Latter-day Saints
American chief executives of manufacturing companies
Area seventies (LDS Church)
Brigham Young University people
Harvard Business School alumni
Johns Hopkins University people
Weber State University alumni
Utah Tech Trailblazers men's basketball players
Junior college men's basketball players in the United States
American chief operating officers
American chief executives of Fortune 500 companies
Latter Day Saints from Utah
American men's basketball players